Frys.com Open was the name of two distinct PGA Tour golf tournaments sponsored by Fry's Electronics, both of which still exist under different names.

Shriners Hospitals for Children Open, played in Las Vegas, known as the Frys.com Open from 2006 to 2007
Safeway Open, played at various locations in Arizona and California, known as the Frys.com Open from 2008 to 2015